The Hampshire Merit Tables are a set of leagues for rugby union teams based in Hampshire and the Isle of Wight for second, third and fourth teams of clubs who up until the 2018-19 season could not enter the first team leagues such as Hampshire 1 and Hampshire 2. 

For the 2014-15 season the structure of the leagues changed to a regional basis consisting of Solent League, Hampshire South East, Hampshire South West and Hampshire North. In 2015-16 Solent League 2 was added. 

In 2016-17 the leagues reverted to the older structure but named Solent League 1, 2, 3 and 4.

Senior Merit Honours

 Most titles Basingstoke II (3)

Merit One Honours

 Most titles Winchester II (2)

Merit Two Honours

 Most titles Tottonians 4th XV (3)

Merit Three Honours

 Most titles Tottonians 4th XV (2)

See also
Hampshire RFU
English rugby union system
Rugby union in England

Notes

References

E
Rugby union in Hampshire